The women's road race at the 2018 Commonwealth Games in Gold Coast, Australia was held on 14 April.

Schedule
The schedule was as follows:

All times are Australian Eastern Standard Time (UTC+10)

Results
The results were as follows:

References

Women's road race
2018 in women's road cycling
Road cycling at the Commonwealth Games